Brachystelechidae is an extinct family of Early Permian microsaurs. The family was first named by Robert L. Carroll and Pamela Gaskill in 1978, with the only member being Brachystelechus fritschi. Brachystelechus fritschi has since been reassigned to the genus Batropetes. Three genera are currently assigned to the family: Batropetes, from Germany; Carrolla, from Texas; and Quasicaecilia, also from Texas.

References

External links
 Brachystelechidae in the Paleobiology Database

Microsauria
Cisuralian first appearances
Cisuralian extinctions